The Larkins is a British television sitcom which was produced by ATV and aired on ITV. It aired for four series between 1958 and 1960. An additional two series (with format changes) aired from 1963 to 1964.

Plot
In the first four series, the family, consisting of Ada Larkin (Peggy Mount), her henpecked husband Alf (David Kossoff), their son Eddie (Shaun O'Riordan),    daughter Joyce (Ruth Trouncer) and her ex-GI husband Jeff (Ronan O'Casey), all lived together at 66 Sycamore Street, next door to inquisitive neighbour Hetty Prout (Barbara Mitchell), her husband Sam (George Roderick), and their daughter Myrtle (Hillary Bamberger), who had an occasional fling with Eddie.

In the final two series, Ada and Alf had an empty nest, moved away from Sycamore Street, and ran a café, employing Hetty (no mention is made of her husband or daughter). They had a lodger, Major Osbert Rigby-Soames (retired) (Hugh Paddick), who always tried to avoid paying his rent.

Spin-offs

Comic strip
The Larkins was adapted into a gag-a-day comic in 1960 by Dutch comics artist Alfred Mazure, published in the Sunday Graphic.

Film
The series was adapted into a film, Inn For Trouble (1960) directed by C.M. Pennington-Richards.

Episode list
Unlike many other British sitcoms of the era, all episodes still exist.

Series 1
Wide Open House (19 September 1958)
Gun-In-Law (26 September 1958)
Catastrophe, aka Cat Happy (3 October 1958)
Angry Young Man (10 October 1958)
Telly-Ho! (17 October 1958)
Ale and Farewell (24 October 1958)
Christmas with the Larkins (26 December 1958)

Series 2
Strictly Commercial (2 February 1959)
Teddy for Eddie (9 February 1959)
Haul for One (16 February 1959)
Gift Horse Power (23 February 1959)
Total Welfare (2 March 1959)
Very Important Parent (9 March 1959)

Series 3
Home Win (8 February 1960)
All Answers (15 February 1960)
A Fiddle in Froth (22 February 1960)
Come Cleaner (29 February 1960)
Stranger than Friction (7 March 1960)
Operation Neighbour (14 March 1960)

Series 4
Unlucky Strike (10 September 1960)
Little Big Brother (17 September 1960)
Gambling Fever (24 September 1960)
Frightful Nightful (1 October 1960)
Match and Scratch (8 October 1960)
Well Turned Worm (15 October 1960)

Series 5
Cafe Ole (9 November 1963)
Teenage Terror (16 November 1963)
Darts & Flowers (23 November 1963)
Help Unwanted (30 November 1963)
Beatle Drive (7 December 1963)
Trading Stampede (14 December 1963)
Strained Relation (21 December 1963)
Saloon Barred (28 December 1963)

Series 6
Think Quicker, Vicar (11 July 1964)
Celebration Blues (18 July 1964)
Gypsy's Warning (25 July 1964)
Minders Keepers (1 August 1964)
Counter Attraction (8 August 1964)
Dizzy Rich (15 August 1964)
Country Style (22 August 1964)

DVD
All six series have been released on DVD by Network.

Broadcast
In 2023 the UK vintage film/nostalgia channel Talking Pictures TV announced that it would be broadcasting the series weekly from 26 March.

References

External links 
 

1958 British television series debuts
1964 British television series endings
1950s British sitcoms
1960s British sitcoms
Black-and-white British television shows
English-language television shows
ITV sitcoms
Television shows adapted into films
Television shows adapted into comics
Television series about families
British television series revived after cancellation
Television shows shot at ATV Elstree Studios